Charmeh or Churmeh may refer to:
 Charmeh, North Khorasan
 Charmeh, South Khorasan